Virasat is a 1997 Indian action drama film, directed by Priyadarshan. The story was written by Kamal Haasan and remade after the success of the Tamil film Thevar Magan. Mushir-Riaz duo produced the film. It stars Anil Kapoor, Tabu, Amrish Puri, Pooja Batra, Milind Gunaji and Govind Namdeo. The  music was composed by Anu Malik and S. P. Venkatesh, with the former composing the songs and the latter composing the score. The film marked the comeback for Priyadarshan in Hindi cinema. Music director Annu Malik reused some of the original tunes of Ilaiyaraaja from Thevar Magan. Tabu has done beatboxing in this movie for the song Payalay Chunmun.

Virasat received sixteen nominations at the 43rd Filmfare Awards, including Best Film, Best Director for Priyadarshan, Best Actor for Kapoor, Best Actress for Tabu, and Best Supporting Actress & Best Female Debut for Batra, and won in seven categories, including Best Film (Critics), Best Actor (Critics) for Kapoor, Best Actress (Critics) for Tabu, Best Supporting Actor for Puri, and Best Story for Haasan.

Plot
After completing his studies in London, Shakti Thakur (Anil Kapoor) returns to his ancestral village in India. Accompanying him is his girlfriend, Anitha (Pooja Batra), whom he is in love with and wants to marry, much to the disapproval of his family. After a few days, Shakti starts to feel that nothing much has changed in his hometown and longs to leave. He tells his father that he wants to sell his share of the family's property and open a chain of  restaurants. His father, the zamindar Raja Thakur (Amrish Puri), urges Shakti to stay in the village and help it progress by virtue of the latter's education, saying "A man gets an education not to become a selfish being but to uplift his uneducated brothers and society". Shakti disagrees with his father and decides to leave. He is unable to bear the animosity amongst the townspeople, particularly between his dad, Raja Thakur, and rival his younger brother Zamindar Birju (Govind Namdeo) (Shakti's disabled uncle) and his son Bali Thakur.

The entire village suffers from this longstanding family feud as most of the village and its surrounding areas is divided between the brothers. Since  Bali Thakur holds a grudge and always tries to one-up Raja Thakur, it puts them at loggerheads with each other.

Shakti spends time in the village with his girlfriend by re-visiting his childhood memories including a game of sticks with Bali Thakur men, which he wins. They come across an old temple which has been closed off on Bali Thakur's instructions. He insists on entering and his friend and servant Sukhiya breaks open the lock for them to look around. Bali Thakur hears of this and a brutal riot is started among the two village factions. Raja Thakur, in order to quell the situation, contemplates  apologising to his opponents. Shakti feels it should be him or Sukhiya who should apologise. When Shakti asks for Sukhiya, he learns that Bali Thakur's men have cut off Sukhiya's hand as punishment for opening the temple and Raja Thakur's men burn down the homes of Bali Thakur villagers in retaliation. To prevent a further escalation of the situation Shakti, with permission from his father, enlists the help of his friend in the government and opens the temple for all legally. Slighted by this, Bali Thakur hires goons to break a dam protecting a part of the village faction that supports Raja Thakur. Although a female villager spots one of the goons near the dam, she does not think much of it.

The dam is damaged by explosives used by the goons which results in flooding of half the village. This results in numerous deaths including infants which deeply saddens Shakti. He spots the goon who placed the explosives again in the village and gives chase. After capturing, he hands the goon over to the police but the goon does not speak of Bali Thakur's involvement due to fear for his own family's safety.

Later Bali Thakur intimidates a villager living in Raja Thakur's area to close a portion of his land, preventing the public from reaching the main road easily. Shakti and his father invite them for talks at village Panchayat to resolve the standoff due to the riots and flooding. In the village panchayat, accusations fly from both sides. With no evidence backing up the truth, Bali Thakur accuses Raja Thakur for orchestrating various attacks on his brother's family and insults him relentlessly. Disrespected and heartbroken, Raja Thakur returns to his home and dies following a heart attack later that night. Shakti takes over his father's duties as the head of the village.

As time passes, this incident dies down. The villagers express concern to Shakti about going around the piece of land that has been closed off and causes a much longer travelling time. Shakti reasons with the owner of the land to open it up for all villagers to pass so that their long commute is shortened. Although understanding and willing, the land owner, is afraid of Bali Thakur's backlash especially since he has a young daughter Gehna (Tabu). Shakti assuages his fear by arranging marriage between a well-to-do person from his village to the land owner's daughter. Everybody involved happily agrees and the land owner opens up the land for everyone.

On the day of the wedding, the groom runs away, fearing Bali Thakur. The landowner and his daughter are distraught over this claiming that it is a huge disrespect to his family. He opines that even if someone marries his daughter, they have to live in constant fear. Shakti then gets permission from the landowner and weds his daughter. Although Shakti still has feelings for his girlfriend and his new bride is very shy, they overcome their awkwardness and move on. Soon, his girlfriend returns and learns the truth. Although saddened by the turn of events, she understands the situation and leaves. Shakti, too, closes the chapter about his girlfriend and starts his new life with his wife.

Bali Thakur,  enraged by the opening of the land, plants a bomb during the village festival despite the pleas of his mother and own father to stop the violence. This results in deaths on both sides of the village. Both factions of the village, wanting revenge, go after Bali Thakur and his family. Shakti protects the innocent family and helps them get away from the villagers. Appreciative of Shakti's efforts to protect them, Birju Thakur finally ends his enmity towards him.

Shakti  eventually finds Bali Thakur and asks him to surrender to the police before the villagers kill him. Bali Thakur's rabid hatred for Shakti makes him reject his offer of help. Bali Thakur, blaming Shakti for all his problems, tries to kill him. In the struggle that follows, Shakti accidentally decapitates Bali Thakur. Although other villagers are willing to take the blame for Bali Thakur's murder, Shakti gives himself up to the police to end the cycle of violence once and for all.

The film  depicts the true meaning of education as "a tool to uplift uneducated people".

Cast
Anil Kapoor as Shakti Thakur
Tabu as Gehna, Shakti Thakur's wife.
Pooja Batra as Anita, Shakti's girlfriend.
Amrish Puri as Raja Thakur
Milind Gunaji as Bali Thakur
Govind Namdeo as Birju Thakur
Satyen Kappu as Narayandas
Dilip Dhawan as Shakti's brother
Neeraj Vora as Sukhiya
Sulabha Deshpande as Bali's mother
Tiku Talsania as Bali's Lawyer
Rita Bhaduri as Mausi
Reena as Raja's wife
Kollam Ajith as Inspector 
Ruhshad Nariman Daruwalla as Jr. Anil Kapoor

Music

Score
The film score was composed by S. P. Venkatesh.

Songs
The songs featured in the movie were composed by Anu Malik, while the lyrics have been penned by Javed Akhtar. K. S. Chithra received the National Film Award for Best Female Playback Singer for the song "Payalay Chunmun". Incidentally, S. Janaki had earlier won the national award for the original version of this song composed by Ilayaraja for film Thevar Magan.

Accolades

Notes

References

External links

 

1997 films
1990s Hindi-language films
Indian romantic musical films
Indian musical drama films
Hindi remakes of Tamil films
Films directed by Priyadarshan
Films scored by Anu Malik
1990s romantic musical films
Films about feuds
1990s action drama films
Indian action drama films